This is a list of career achievements by Annemiek van Vleuten, a Dutch professional racing cyclist for UCI Women's Team, .

Major results

Road
Source: 

2008
 World University Championships
2nd  Time trial
3rd  Road race
 5th Overall Ster Zeeuwsche Eilanden
 6th Grand Prix Elsy Jacobs
2009
 1st Ronde van Rijssen
 1st Klever Radrennen
 10th Overall Holland Ladies Tour
2010
 1st  Overall La Route de France
1st Stage 3
 1st Novilon Eurocup Ronde van Drenthe
 1st Ronde van Barendrecht
 2nd Overall Gracia–Orlová
1st Stage 2
 2nd Overall Iurreta-Emakumeen Bira
1st Stage 4
 2nd Ronde van Drenthe
 3rd Overall Ster Zeeuwsche Eilanden
 3rd Drentse 8 van Dwingeloo
 3rd GP Stad Roeselare
 3rd GP Ciudad de Valladolid
 3rd Emakumeen Saria
 3rd Open de Suède Vårgårda TTT
 4th Open de Suède Vårgårda
 5th Overall Tour de l'Aude Cycliste Féminin
 7th Overall Holland Ladies Tour
 7th Overall Giro della Toscana Int. Femminile – Memorial Michela Fanini
 7th Ronde van Gelderland
 8th Grand Prix de Dottignies
 10th Tour of Flanders
2011
 1st  Overall UCI World Cup
 1st Tour of Flanders
 1st Open de Suède Vårgårda
 1st GP de Plouay – Bretagne
 2nd Overall Tour of Chongming Island
 2nd 7-Dorpenomloop Aalburg
 3rd Overall Trophée d'Or Féminin
 3rd Trofeo Alfredo Binda
 3rd Grand Prix de Dottignies
 4th Grand Prix Elsy Jacobs
 4th Tour of Chongming Island
 6th Omloop Het Nieuwsblad
 6th Ronde van Drenthe
 6th La Flèche Wallonne
 9th Overall Holland Ladies Tour
 10th Durango-Durango Emakumeen Saria
2012
 National Championships
1st  Road race
2nd Time trial
 1st GP Stad Roeselare
 1st Holland Hills Classic
 1st 7-Dorpenomloop Aalburg
 2nd Overall Festival Elsy Jacobs
1st Prologue & Stage 2
 3rd Overall Emakumeen Euskal Bira
1st Points classification
1st Stage 4
 3rd GP Comune di Cornaredo
 5th Durango-Durango Emakumeen Saria
 6th Overall Giro della Toscana
1st Points classification
1st Prologue
2013
 1st Ronde van Geldrop
 1st Ronde van Rijssen
 1st Omloop der Kempen
 1st Prologue Festival Elsy Jacobs
 1st Stage 3 Thüringen Rundfahrt
 2nd  Team time trial, UCI World Championships
 2nd Overall Holland Ladies Tour
 2nd Open de Suède Vårgårda TTT
 National Championships
3rd Road race
3rd Time trial
 3rd Holland Hills Classic
 4th Omloop Het Nieuwsblad
 5th Tour of Flanders
 6th Durango-Durango Emakumeen Saria
 7th Trofeo Alfredo Binda
 8th EPZ Omloop van Borsele
 9th 7-Dorpenomloop Aalburg
 9th GP de Plouay
 10th Overall Trophée d'Or Féminin
1st Stage 6
 10th Ronde van Gelderland
2014
 1st  Time trial, National Championships
 1st  Overall Belgium Tour
1st Prologue, Stages 1 & 2 (TTT)
 2nd Open de Suède Vårgårda TTT
 5th Ronde van Drenthe World Cup
 5th Tour of Flanders
 6th Omloop van het Hageland
 6th Ronde van Gelderland
 6th Ronde van Overijssel
 6th Durango-Durango Emakumeen Saria
 7th Open de Suède Vårgårda
 8th Overall Giro d'Italia
1st Prologue & Stage 3
 9th Overall Ladies Tour of Norway
 9th Omloop Het Nieuwsblad
 10th EPZ Omloop van Borsele
2015
 1st Prologue Giro d'Italia
 2nd Overall Festival Luxembourgeois du cyclisme féminin Elsy Jacobs
 2nd La Flèche Wallonne
 European Games
3rd  Time trial
7th Road race
 3rd Road race, National Championships
 3rd Overall Giro della Toscana Int.
1st Prologue
 3rd Acht van Westerveld
 4th Tour of Flanders
 7th Overall Emakumeen Euskal Bira
1st Prologue
 7th Trofeo Alfredo Binda
 9th Strade Bianche
 10th Overall Holland Ladies Tour
2016
 1st  Time trial, National Championships
 1st  Overall Belgium Tour
1st Prologue & Stage 3
 2nd Overall Energiewacht Tour
 2nd Holland Hills Classic
 3rd Overall Auensteiner–Radsporttage
1st Stage 2a (ITT)
 4th Overall Thüringen Rundfahrt
 5th Time trial, UCI World Championships
 6th Omloop van het Hageland
 6th Gent–Wevelgem
 7th Strade Bianche
 7th Tour of Flanders
 8th Trofeo Alfredo Binda
 9th Overall Festival Luxembourgeois du cyclisme féminin Elsy Jacobs
1st Points classification
1st Prologue
 9th Ronde van Drenthe
 9th Omloop van Borsele
2017
 UCI World Championships
1st  Time trial
4th Road race
 1st  Time trial, National Championships
 1st  Overall Holland Ladies Tour
1st Prologue & Stage 3 (ITT)
 1st Cadel Evans Great Ocean Road Race
 1st Durango-Durango Emakumeen Saria
 1st La Course by Le Tour de France
 2nd Overall Emakumeen Euskal Bira
1st Stage 4
 3rd Overall Giro d'Italia
1st  Points classification
1st  Mountains classification
1st Stages 2 & 5 (ITT)
 3rd Omloop Het Nieuwsblad
 3rd Amstel Gold Race
 4th Tour of Flanders
 4th La Flèche Wallonne
 5th Strade Bianche
 5th Ronde van Drenthe
 5th Liège–Bastogne–Liège
 6th Trofeo Alfredo Binda
2018
 UCI World Championships
1st  Time trial
7th Road race
 1st  Overall UCI World Tour
 1st  Overall Giro Rosa
1st  Points classification
1st Stages 7 (ITT), 9 & 10
 1st  Overall Holland Ladies Tour
1st  Points classification
1st Prologue, Stages 1 & 5 (ITT)
 1st La Course by Le Tour de France
 1st Veenendaal–Veenendaal Classic
 2nd Overall Emakumeen Euskal Bira
1st Stage 2 (ITT)
 2nd Overall Herald Sun Tour
1st Stage 2 (ITT)
 2nd Durango-Durango Emakumeen Saria
 2nd Team time trial, Tour of Norway
 3rd Tour of Flanders
 3rd Liège–Bastogne–Liège
 4th La Flèche Wallonne
 5th Dwars door Vlaanderen
 6th Overall Tour Down Under
2019
 UCI World Championships
1st  Road race
3rd  Time trial
 1st  Time trial, National Championships
 1st  Overall Giro Rosa
1st  Points classification
1st  Mountains classification
1st Stages 5 & 6 (ITT)
 1st Strade Bianche
 1st Liège–Bastogne–Liège
 2nd Tour of Flanders
 2nd Amstel Gold Race
 2nd La Flèche Wallonne
 4th Omloop Het Nieuwsblad
 6th Overall Emakumeen Euskal Bira
 6th Overall Holland Ladies Tour
1st Prologue
 7th Dwars door Vlaanderen
 7th La Course by Le Tour de France
2020
 1st  Road race, UEC European Championships
 1st Omloop Het Nieuwsblad
 1st Emakumeen Nafarroako Klasikoa
 1st Clasica Femenina Navarra
 1st Durango-Durango Emakumeen Saria
 1st Strade Bianche
 1st Stage 2 Giro Rosa
 2nd  Road race, UCI World Championships
 2nd Road race, National Championships
 5th La Course by Le Tour de France
 6th Overall Challenge by La Vuelta
2021
 Olympic Games
1st  Time trial
2nd  Road race
 1st  Overall UCI World Tour
 1st  Overall Setmana Ciclista Valenciana
1st Stage 1
 1st  Overall Tour of Norway
1st Stage 3
 1st  Overall Challenge by La Vuelta
1st Stages 2 (ITT) & 3
 1st Dwars door Vlaanderen
 1st Tour of Flanders
 1st Donostia San Sebastián Klasikoa
 1st Emakumeen Nafarroako Klasikoa
 UCI World Championships
2nd  Mixed relay
3rd  Time trial
 2nd Overall Vuelta a Burgos
 2nd Liège–Bastogne–Liège
 2nd Gran Premio Ciudad de Eibar
 2nd Durango-Durango Emakumeen Saria
 3rd Amstel Gold Race
 3rd Clasica Femenina Navarra
 4th Time trial, National Championships
 4th Strade Bianche
 4th La Flèche Wallonne
 9th Road race, UEC European Championships
2022
 UCI World Championships
1st  Road race
7th Time trial
 1st  Overall UCI World Tour
 1st  Overall Tour de France
1st Stages 7 & 8
 Combativity award Stage 7
 1st  Overall Giro d'Italia
1st  Points classification
1st Stages 4 & 8
 1st  Overall Challenge by La Vuelta
1st Stage 2
 1st  Overall Setmana Ciclista Valenciana
1st Stage 3
 1st Omloop Het Nieuwsblad
 1st Liège–Bastogne–Liège
 2nd Overall Tour de Romandie
 2nd Strade Bianche
 2nd Tour of Flanders
 2nd La Flèche Wallonne
 4th Amstel Gold Race
2023
 4th Overall Setmana Ciclista Valenciana
 4th Strade Bianche

General classification results timeline

Classics results timeline

Major championship results timeline

Track
2017
 2nd Individual pursuit, UCI World Cup, Pruszków
2018
 2nd  Individual pursuit, UCI World Championships

Awards

References

Van Vleuten